Alexander Alekseevich Labutkin (1910 – 1935), known as The One-Armed Bandit, was a Soviet serial killer and mass murderer, who committed 15 murders in the area of the Prigorodny settlement of the Leningrad Oblast between 1933 and 1935.

Biography 
Labutkin was born in 1910 in St. Petersburg to a working-class family. At the end of the 1920s, he got a job as a gunsmith at the Krasnoznamyonets arms factory. In 1930, while engaged in uprooting stumps with pyroxylin, Labutkin accidentally produced a premature detonation, as a result of which he lost his right hand. In this regard, he could no longer work as a gunner, and therefore he got a job as a steam conductor at the Okhta Combine in Leningrad. Labutkin was extremely passionate about fashionable things. According to the memoirs of his acquaintances, he was very fond of wearing a dark jacket and a wide-brimmed hat, which created an opinion that he was an important personality.

On August 30, 1933, Labutkin, disguised as a mushroom picker, took a revolver and went to the forest located behind the Powder plants in the area of Prigorodny village. There he met a company of two men and three women, after which he fired several shots at them. Four died on the spot, and one woman died after some time in the hospital, without having time to give the investigators any evidence. The bullets that the killer had used in committing the crime were made by his acquaintance from the elements of a ball bearing. From the crime scene, Labutkin took away items of insignificant value, which suggests that self-interest was not a driving force in his crimes.

On December 2, 1933, in the same forest, Labutkin shot two more people. He took a couple of valenki, food and several other items from the corpses. On April 11, 1934, He ambushed and shot down an elderly locksmith. He stole money and the suitcase with instruments from the murdered man, also pulling off the gold crowns from his teeth. His crimes were characterized by long pauses between the attacks. Six months later, on November 13, 1934, he shot a birdwatcher who was inspecting songbirds. Labutkin then stole a cage with captured birds in it. On January 11, 1935, Labutkin shot two married couples walking in the woods in the span of two hours. Again, he did not steal items of any special value from the crime scene. A month later, on February 17, 1935, Latbukin killed a lonely worker. He used his wife, Maria, to distract his last victims. On March 18, 1935, Labutkin made another attack on a couple. The man was killed, but the woman survived with slight injuries. She identified the murderer, and Labutkin was soon detained.

Trial and execution 
The investigation into the Labutkin case was short-lived, as Labutkin himself confessed to committing 12 murders. In addition to Maria Labutkina, several others were also arrested on suspicion of concealing the killer's crimes. In the summer of 1935, a trial was held, during which the Special Council of the NKVD sentenced Labutkin to death, while the remaining defendants got long term prison sentences. Soon after, Labutkin was executed by firing squad.

In the media 
 Documentary film "Shooter" from the series "The investigation was conducted..."

See also
 List of Russian serial killers
 List of serial killers by number of victims

References

Literature 

 A. I. Rakitin: Socialism does not breed crime - Yekaterinburg: Cabinet Scientist, 2016 - 530 p.

1910 births
1935 deaths
Executed mass murderers
Executed Soviet serial killers
Male serial killers
People executed by the Soviet Union by firearm
People convicted of murder by the Soviet Union
Serial mass murderers
Soviet mass murderers